Richard Rogers "R. R." Bowker (September 4, 1848 – November 12, 1933) was a journalist, editor of Publishers Weekly and Harper's Magazine, and founder of the R. R. Bowker Company.

Early life and education
Richard Rogers Bowker was born in Salem, Massachusetts, on September 4, 1848, to a successful, educated family.

 Family
His paternal grandfather, Joel Bowker (1775–1858) rose from a grocery clerk to a leading merchant and part owner of sailing vessels.  Bowker Place in Salem is named after Joel Bowker.

His mother, Theresa Maria Bowker (née Savory; 1825–1906), was the daughter of Richard Savory (1781–1841), who owned a large cooperage in Salem.  His father, Daniel Rogers Bowker (1820–1895), was a partner in a prestigious business enterprise involving the sale of coal and salt in Salem until the financial panic in 1857, coupled with the death of the leading partner in the business, caused the business to fail.

The family moved to New York City where Bowker's father started a barrel-making business. The business never prospered, so the family never regained the affluence it had enjoyed. The plan for Bowker to attend Harvard had to be scrapped. Instead, he attended the Free School in 1863 and entered the City College of New York in 1866.

Bowker thrived at City College. He founded, edited, managed and published The Collegian, one of the first college newspapers in the country. He was an organizer and member of the student senate. Bowker was instrumental in establishing a chapter of Phi Beta Kappa at the college, but, ironically, was blackballed from membership by the school's president for his "radical" activities in student government and the student newspaper. Years later the injustice was corrected. In 1868 he graduated with a B.A. in journalism.

Bowker married Alice G. Mitchell (1864–1941) in Brookline, Massachusetts on January 1, 1902.  Alice's mother, Zilpha Maria Mitchell (née Morton; 1834–1888) was a first cousin of Levi Parsons Morton (1824–1920), 22nd Vice President of the United States (1889–1893) and 31st Governor of New York (1895–1897).

Career
After graduation Bowker began his successful career in journalism at the newly established New York Evening Mail where he was city editor and literary editor from 1868 to 1874. From 1875 to 1878 he wrote a column for the New York Tribune and became manager of The New York Times in 1896. Between 1880 and 1882 he lived in London and managed the British edition of Harper's Magazine.

In addition to journalism, he also became involved in publishing and book sales. He assisted in organizing the first American Book Trade Show and was hired by prestigious London and New York publishers as their representatives at various times. In 1872 Bowker and his friend and mentor, Frederick Leypoldt, began publishing the Publishers Weekly (then The Publishers' Weekly), which became the most important book-trade journal in America. Bowker served as an owner and editor of the publication for fifty years.

Interests and activities

Bowker became interested in politics at City College. In 1880 he founded the Society for Political Education to inform the public on social and political issues. He was a liberal Republican who played a leading role in enacting of civil service and municipal reforms in New York in the 1880s and in 1880 wrote the civil service reform plank that was adopted in the national Republican platform. In 1879 he was a leading member of the independent Republican Movement, also known as the "Mugwump" movement in national politics. In 1880 the Mugwumps helped defeat the nomination of Ulysses Grant for a third term because of the scandals during his administrations.

Service to libraries and librarians

In May 1876 Bowker, Leypoldt, and Melvil Dewey met in New York City to discuss the development of libraries. At the time the country had 3,647 libraries with 300 or more books.

The number of books in these libraries totaled 12,276,964. The libraries operated on a subscription basis with no access to shelves and no children's sections. No uniform system for classifying books existed. Libraries were shifting from bound-volume catalogues to hand-written catalogue cards of varied sizes. At the meeting the three men agreed to establish a library profession, to publish a library journal and to organize a national library association.

In September 1876 Leypoldt and Bowker published volume one of the Library Journal. Melvil Dewey was the managing editor of the journal. They organized the American Library Association in October, 1876. The organization would be used as a model for many European countries. After a few years Dewey left the publication for financial and personal reasons. Bowker remained the heart and soul of the publication for many years despite its lack of financial success. He not only wrote regular editorials, but also numerous essays on the library system for the publication.

In March 1884 Leypoldt died. Despite the fact that Leypoldt's bibliography project had been a time-consuming, financial loss, Bowker, a chairman of the Committee on Public Documents of the American Library Association, took on the responsibility for the American Catalogue, an index of all books published in the United States. Furthermore, he added three new features, United States government documents, publications of American literary, scientific and other societies and state government publications. During the next fifteen years he published a revised edition of the catalogue every five years.

Bowker worked tirelessly for the benefit of libraries throughout his adult life. More than once he was asked to be president of the American Library Association, but declined because he thought it would be inappropriate since he was not a librarian. He regularly attended A.L.A. conventions and was selected as an honorary member of the organization for all his many contributions to libraries and the library profession.

His efforts in behalf of individual libraries were many. In 1885 Bowker helped organize and was the first president of the New York Library Club. He served as a trustee for the Brooklyn Public Library from its incorporation in 1902 until his death and gave most of his personal library to it. For twenty-four years he served as president of the Stockbridge Library Association in Massachusetts. He generously donated ten thousand dollars to the Library of Congress for bibliographical services. It was written of Bowker that "Few in the library world had wider acquaintance, few had more lasting friendships, few were more generous in recognition of new talent, few more cherishing of old memories." All of this and more earned Bowker a spot as one of the “100…most important leaders we had in the 20th century.”

Selected works 
 The arts of life
 Author: Bowker, R. R. 1848–1933.; Rogers, Bruce, Publication: Boston : Houghton, Mifflin and Co. ; Cambridge : Riverside Press, 1900
 Of work and wealth; a summary of economics 
 Author: Bowker, R. R. 1848–1933. Publication: New York, Society for Political Education, 1883
 The American catalogue
 Author: Pylodet, L. (anagram for Leypoldt); Bowker, R. R. Publication: New York : P. Smith, 1941, 1881
 The College of the City of New York : 1847-1895 /
 Author: Bowker, R. R. 1848–1933. Publication: New York? : s.n., 1895
 Copyright: its history and its law
Author: Bowker, R. R. 1848–1933. Publication: Buffalo, N.Y. : W.S. Hein, 2002, 1912

Notes

References

Works cited

Further reading
Bowker, R. R., Edward Atkinson, Daniel Rogers Bowker, Alice G. Mitchell Bowker, Caroline Theresa Bowker, Melvil Dewey, Abraham L. Earle, et al. 1856. Richard Rogers Bowker Papers. 
Library Journal (Firm). 1933. Richard Rogers Bowker, 1848–1933.
Foster, William E. 1926. Five men of '76. Chicago: American library Association.

External links
 
 
 
 
 
 

1848 births
1933 deaths
American magazine editors